Fiji made its British Empire Games début in 1938 in Sydney, Australia.

The colony competed only in lawn bowls, sending competitors to the men's doubles and the men's fours events. (Lawn bowls events at the 1938 Games were for men only.) Fiji's representatives did not win any medals.

Medals

Sources
 Fiji results for the 1938 Games, Commonwealth Games Federation

Nations at the 1938 British Empire Games
Fiji at the Commonwealth Games
1938 in Fiji